Elizabeth Cooper (born Isabel Rosario Cooper; January 15, 1914 (or 1909/1912) – June 29, 1960) was a Filipina film actress, vaudeville dancer, and singer. In addition to her brief movie career, Cooper was also known for being the mistress of General Douglas MacArthur.

Born in Manila, she was famous for the first onscreen kiss in Philippine cinema for the movie, Ang Tatlong Hambog (1926) when she was around the age of 12. In the 1930s, she met US General Douglas MacArthur and became his paramour when she was around the age of 16 (or 18/21) and he was in his 50s. He arranged for her to follow him to Washington, D.C.

While serving as Army Chief of Staff in the 1930s, MacArthur filed a libel action against a journalist at The Washington Post, Drew Pearson. When Pearson added Cooper to his list of witnesses to be deposed, MacArthur dropped the suit. MacArthur subsequently paid Cooper $15,000 to leave Washington, the money allegedly delivered by his aide, Dwight Eisenhower. However, she did not return to the Philippines, and after a few failed attempts in Hollywood and a hair dressing shop in the Midwest, she committed suicide in 1960.

Personal life

Elizabeth was born Isabel Rosario Cooper to what may have been a Scottish father Arthur Edmund Cooper and a Chinese-Filipina mother Rosario Lopez, who was a haciendera (farm estate owner) from Vallehermoso, Negros Oriental. Her death certificate however lists her father as Isaac Cooper and her mother’s name as Josephine. She was nicknamed "Dimples". As a teenager she traveled Southeast Asia as a torch singer / entertainer.

Film career
Isabel appeared in a few B-grade Filipino films starting in 1925, under the screen name "Chabing". Two of her films were Miracles of Love (1925) and Ang Tatlong Hambog (1926). In the latter film, Cooper made history with Luis Tuason when they performed the very first kissing scene in a Philippine film. She was just around 12 years old at the time.

She did not act in any Filipino films after 1930, although the 1941 Tagalog film Ikaw Pala is sometimes wrongly attributed to her. "Ikaw Pala" had another actress named Cresencia Aligada acting in it in a supporting role; Aligada also went by the screen name "Dimples," hence the mistaken identity.

After her 1934 break-up with MacArthur, Cooper attempted to find roles in Hollywood, landing some smaller bit roles under the stage name "Chabing" including The Chinese Ring (1947), The Art of Burlesque (1950), and I Was an American Spy (1951).

Relationship with General MacArthur

In 1930, at the age of 16 (or 18/21), Cooper met the American General Douglas MacArthur, then commander of all U.S. troops in the Philippines. MacArthur's marriage had ended a year earlier. Cooper became his mistress in Manila, a fact the 50-year-old MacArthur hid from his 80-year-old mother. In Manila, the teenaged Cooper lived in Paco.

Five months after they first met, MacArthur returned to the United States; while he intended to bring her to Washington, he could not risk scandal by traveling with her, so he bought her a ticket on a ship to arrive after him. She arrived in Washington and ended up ensconced in an apartment in Georgetown, Washington, D.C. MacArthur later moved her to the Chastleton Hotel (now a co-op building). According to one biographer of MacArthur, William Manchester, MacArthur "showered [Cooper] with presents and bought her many lacy tea gowns, but no raincoat. She didn't need one, he told her; her duty lay in bed."

In 1933, when the secret affair threatened to become public, MacArthur brought it to an end, reportedly giving her $15,000 and a ticket back to the Philippines. She did not use the ticket and never returned to the Philippines. In 1934, the 20-year-old (or 22/25-year-old) Cooper moved to the Midwestern United States, where she owned a hairdressing salon, before moving to Los Angeles several years later.

Cooper tried to find work as an actress in Hollywood; however, the only roles that she could manage were those as an extra, such as a geisha and a Filipina nurse in films. In 1946 she was one of Rex Harrison's concubines in Anna and the King of Siam.  In Unconquered (1947 film) she was an unidentified and uncredited Native American.

Death
Cooper committed suicide by overdosing on barbiturates in 1960. She was 46 (or 48/51) years old. She was buried on July 5, 1960 in Holy Cross Cemetery in Culver City, California.

Filmography
 1925 Miracles of Love
 1926 Ang Tatlong Hambog
 1927 Fate or Consequence
1947 The Chinese Ring
1950 The Art of Burlesque
1951 I Was an American Spy

References

Bibliography

External links
 

1914 births
1960 suicides
Douglas MacArthur
Drug-related suicides in California
Barbiturates-related deaths
Filipino emigrants to the United States
Filipino film actresses
Filipino silent film actresses
Actresses from Manila
Filipino people of American descent
Filipino people of Chinese descent
Filipino people of Dutch descent
Filipino people of Scottish descent
20th-century Filipino actresses
People from Georgetown (Washington, D.C.)